Jaong is a village in Satar Mese District, Manggarai Regency in East Nusa Tenggara Province. Its population is 1219.

Climate
Jaong has a subtropical highland climate (Cfb). It has moderate rainfall from June to September and heavy to very heavy rainfall in the remaining months.

References

East Nusa Tenggara
Villages in Indonesia